In basketball, an assist is a pass to a teammate that directly leads to a score by field goal. All of the players on this list have recorded at least 20 assists in a National Collegiate Athletic Association (NCAA) Division I game. Assists were first recognized in the 1950–51 season, but only lasted through 1951–52 before the NCAA stopped recording them until the 1983–84 season. All players on this list have accumulated at least 20 assists in a game while playing for a Division I university. Through the most recent 2019–20 season, this has occurred only 22 times.

The single game record is 24 assists, set by Cameron Parker of Sacred Heart on December 1, 2019. The previous record of 22 had been accomplished by four players. Four 21-assist performances have been recorded, while the 15 remaining instances have been 20 assists.

No school has had more than one player reach the 20-assist mark. Southern University is on this list four times via Johnson's four 20-assist games during his career. Johnson, who spent his first two college seasons at New Mexico Junior College and then Cameron University, only played NCAA Division I basketball for two seasons (1987, 1988). He led Division I in assists per game both years and set the still-standing record of 13.30 assists per game in 1987–88. Cameron Parker joins him as the only two players in Division I history to reach 20 assists more than once.

Key

Dates of 20+ assists

See also
List of National Basketball Association players with most assists in a game

References
General

Specific

NCAA Division I men's basketball statistical leaders